Jamal-ud-Din Faqir  was a mystic singer from Sindh Pakistan. He was born in 1952 at village Chhutan Wassan, near Bobi Station, near Sanghar. He also went to Rome to perform at the death anniversary of Jalal ud-Din Rumi  in 2016. He died on 26 June 2016 due to intestine problem in a private hospital of Hyderabad at the age of 64.

See also
 Allan Fakir
 Shah Abdul Latif Bhittai
 Shaikh Ayaz

References

Sindhi people
Pakistani male singers